The Roman Catholic Diocese of Santander is a diocese seated in Santander Cathedral in the city of Santander in the Ecclesiastical province of Oviedo in Spain.

History
 12 December 1754: Established as Diocese of Santander from the Metropolitan Archdiocese of Burgos

Leadership

Francisco Javier Arriaza (24 Sep 1755 – 10 Oct 1761 )
Francisco Laso Santos de San Pedro (29 Mar 1762 – 14 May 1783 )
Rafael Tomás Menéndez Luarca y Queipo de Llano (25 Jun 1784 – 20 Jun 1819 )
Juan Nepomuceno Gómez Durán (21 Feb 1820 – 11 Apr 1829 )
Felipe González Abarca, O. de M. (30 Aug 1829 – 12 Mar 1842 )
Manuel Ramón Arias Teijeiro de Castro (17 Jan 1848 – 20 Jul 1859 )
José López Crespo (20 Sep 1859 – 21 Mar 1875 )
Vicente Calvo y Valero (5 Jul 1875 – 27 Mar 1884 )
Vicente Santiago Sánchez de Castro (27 Mar 1884 – 19 Sep 1920 )
Juan Plaza y García (16 Dec 1920 – 10 Jul 1927 )
José María Eguino Trecu (2 Oct 1928 – 7 May 1961 )
Eugenio Beitia Aldazabal  (27 Jan 1962 – 23 Jan 1965 )
Vincente Puchol Montis (2 Jul 1965 – 8 May 1967 )
José María Cirarda Lachiondo  (22 Jul 1968 – 3 Dec 1971 )
Juan Antonio del Val Gallo  (3 Dec 1971 – 23 Aug 1991 )
José Vilaplana Blasco (23 Aug 1991 – 17 Jul 2006 )
Vicente Jiménez Zamora (27 Jul 2007 – 12 Dec 2014)
Manuel Sánchez Monge (6 May 2015 – present)

See also
Roman Catholicism in Spain

Sources
 Catholic Hierarchy
  Diocese website

Roman Catholic dioceses in Spain
Religious organizations established in 1754
Dioceses established in the 18th century
Santander, Spain
1754 establishments in Spain